Balin  is a village in the administrative district of Gmina Poddębice, within Poddębice County, Łódź Voivodeship, in central Poland.

The village has a population of 110.

History
During the German invasion of Poland at the start of World War II, on September 8, 1939, German troops carried out a massacre of 21 Polish farmers in Balin (see Nazi crimes against the Polish nation). During the subsequent German occupation, in 1942, the German gendarmerie carried out expulsions of Poles, who were then enslaved as forced labour in the area.

References

Villages in Poddębice County
Massacres of Poles
Nazi war crimes in Poland